This is a list of underpasses and tunnels in Singapore. Only vehicular underpasses and tunnels with official names are shown below.

List of underpasses

List of tunnels

See also
List of bridges in Singapore

Tunnels
Singapore

Tunnels